Spring Garden College—founded in 1851 as the Spring Garden Institute—was a private technical college in the Spring Garden section of Philadelphia. Its building at 523-25 North Broad Street (demolished) was designed by architect Stephen Decatur Button.

The Broad Street building housed the institute until 1969. The school relocated to 102 East Mermaid Lane at the former Yarnall-Waring Company Machine Works and
was renamed "Spring Garden College" with bachelor's degree programs being offered for the first time. In 1985 the college moved to 7500 Germantown Avenue in nearby Mt. Airy. Declining enrollment and financial problems forced its closure in 1992.

Prior to its closing, Spring Garden was regionally accredited by the Commission on Higher Education of the Middle States Association of Colleges and Schools.  Additionally, the Baccalaureate Degree programs in Computer Engineering Technology, Electronics engineering technology, and Mechanical Engineering Technology were accredited by the Technology Accreditation Commission of the Accreditation Board for Engineering and Technology (ABET).

Notable alumni
Harrison Albright, architect
Charles Grafly, sculptor
Hannah Tempest Jenkins, painter
Eldridge R. Johnson, inventor, founder of Victor Talking Machine Company
John B. Kelly Sr., building contractor (father of actress Grace Kelly)
Albert Laessle, sculptor
Samuel Maclure, architect
Everett Shinn, painter
John Sloan, painter
William South, photographer & inventor
George Hand Wright, painter
Ken Wright, racecar driver & mechanic
August Zeller, sculptor

References

External links
 History of Spring Garden College
 Photo of Trustee's Hall at the Germantown Avenue site 
 Spring Garden College informational site
 

Defunct universities and colleges in Philadelphia
Defunct private universities and colleges in Pennsylvania
Educational institutions established in 1851
1851 establishments in Pennsylvania
1992 disestablishments in Pennsylvania